The 2005–06 PBA season was the 31st season of the Philippine Basketball Association. It began on October 2, 2005, and ended on July 21, 2006. The season had two conferences played, the import-laiden 2005–06 San Mig Coffee Fiesta Conference and the season-ending 2006 Gran Matador Brandy Philippine Cup.

Opening ceremonies
The muses for the participating teams are as follows:

2005–06 Fiesta Conference

Red Bull Barako won the 2005–06 Fiesta Conference defeating the Purefoods Chunkee Giants in six games. The Air21 Express defeated Barangay Ginebra Kings to capture third place in a one-game playoff.

Enrico Villanueva of Red Bull won the Best Player of the Conference honors while Purefoods' import Marquin Chandler won the Best Import Award. The league introduced a Give Me 5 Promo, in which tickets for Upper Box B and General Admission seats would cost only five pesos. The marketing scheme paid off as the league had multiple soldout games during the conference.

In the 2005 PBA All-Star Game held in Laoag City, Ilocos Norte on November 26, 2005, the North All-Stars defeated the South All-Stars. Ginebra's Jayjay Helterbrand won the All-Star Game MVP honors.

Classification round

Playoffs

Finals

|}
Finals MVP: Lordy Tugade (Red Bull)
Best Player of the Conference: Enrico Villanueva (Red Bull)
Best Import Award: Marquin Chandler (Purefoods)

2006 Philippine Cup

The Purefoods Chunkee Giants defeated the Red Bull Barako, 4-2, in their best-of-seven Finals series to win the Philippine Cup. On the third place playoff, the Alaska Aces defeated the San Miguel Beermen.

The South All-Stars defeated the North All-Stars 122–120 in the All-Star Game held in Cagayan de Oro on April 29, 2006. Asi Taulava was named as the All-Star Game MVP.

On May 14, 2006, an incident occurred when Purefoods' Eugene Tejada suffered a career-threatening injury against Red Bull, suffering extensive neck and spinal cord injuries.

Classification round

Wildcard round

Playoffs

Finals

|}
Finals MVP: Marc Pingris (Purefoods)
Best Player of the Conference: Danny Seigle (San Miguel)

Cumulative standings

Overall standings

Classification rounds
Includes one-game playoffs.

Playoffs

Awards
 Most Valuable Player: James Yap (Purefoods)
 Rookie of the Year: Larry Fonacier (Red Bull)
 Most Improved Player: Marc Pingris (Purefoods)
 Mythical Five:
 Kerby Raymundo (Purefoods)
 James Yap (Purefoods)
 Roger Yap (Purefoods)
 Enrico Villanueva (Red Bull)
 Lordy Tugade (Red Bull)
 Mythical Second Team:
 Mark Caguioa (Barangay Ginebra)
 Dorian Peña (San Miguel)
 Danny Seigle (San Miguel)
 Mike Cortez (Alaska)
 Marc Pingris (Purefoods)
All-Defensive Team:
 Dorian Peña (San Miguel)
 Marc Pingris (Purefoods)
 Wynne Arboleda (Air21)
 Topex Robinson (Red Bull)
 Nic Belasco (Alaska)

Awards given by the PBA Press Corps
 Coach of the Year: Ryan Gregorio (Purefoods)
 Mr. Quality Minutes: Ronald Tubid (Air21)
 Comeback Player of the Year: Danny Seigle (San Miguel)
 Referee of the Year: Luisito Cruz
All-Rookie Team
Paolo Bugia (Red Bull)
Dennis Miranda (Coca-Cola)
Leo Najorda (Red Bull)
KG Canaleta (Air21)
Larry Fonacier (Red Bull)

References

External links
 PBA.ph

 
PBA